Hexachaeta bondari is a species of tephritid or fruit flies in the genus Hexachaeta of the family Tephritidae.

It is found in Bahia, Brazil.

References

Further reading
 

bondari